William Todd-Jones (born 1958) is a Welsh puppeteer, puppet designer, performer, director, movement consultant and writer for film, television and theatre in the UK and abroad. 

As an environmentalist, Todd-Jones is a longstanding patron of the wildlife charity Save The Rhino International, and has been involved with many other conservation projects.

Early life
Todd-Jones grew up in the village of Nantyglo in Wales. He attended Hafod y Ddol grammar school and Nantyglo Comprehensive School. He studied dance and acting at the Royal Welsh College of Music and Drama in Cardiff. He then left for America to, as he put it, "Escape Thatcher, write poetry, seek opportunity and discover myself."

Career
Now residing in Chagford, he has performed creatures and puppets in numerous feature films, including The Hitchhiker's Guide to the Galaxy, Harry Potter and the Order of the Phoenix, Jim Henson's Labyrinth, the various Muppet movies, The Neverending Story, Judge Dredd, Batman, The Adventures of Pinocchio, Lost in Space, Who Framed Roger Rabbit, 101 Dalmatians and Fierce Creatures. He also worked on the television series His Dark Materials.

Jones worked on the Disney movie John Carter of Mars, directed by Andrew Stanton, for which he taught stilt-walking and was the in-camera reference for Carter's loveable 'best friend' Woola. He has also worked with the renowned Aardman on various projects as both a performer and creature consultant... on one occasion being the 'plasticine puppet' in a stop motion world record.

From 2012-2015, he toured the world as the Master Puppeteer and Manny performer in the Stage Entertainment arena show Ice Age Live.

He spent 2017 as puppet shop director for Cirque du Soliel affiliates Monlove in Montreal, where he helped build the workshop, assemble the team and oversee the build for the theatre version of the successful animated film The Nut Job.

2018 was spent in Wales with Bad Wolf, as Master Puppeteer and creating the Creature FX department for the BBC/HBO adaptation of Philip Pullman's, His Dark Materials. Working closely with the Vfx vendors Framestore, the series directors and the actors, Todd developed a methodology  & style that permitted the successful use of puppet proxies and acting rigs, "So that the actors would believe and the characters be made real". The work gained the 2020 BAFTA for best Vfx.

He has consulted for the Bristol Robotics Lab on how people might best interact with robots.

For TV, he performed in Aslan the lion (rear legs) and played Glenstorm the centaur, in the BBC's rendition of C.S. Lewis's The Chronicles of Narnia; he played the starring role of Mopatop in the BAFTA Award-nominated children's television series Mopatop's Shop from 2002-2005; and has performed creatures as diverse as a troll, a lap dancing mouse, and a three-toed sloth. 

In 1997, he created an outdoor theatre spectacle, Spirit of the Rhino Drum, for the rhino charity. He wrote, designed, and directed this extravaganza on the theme of wildlife conservation, which was performed at major festivals across the UK, by African musicians, puppeteers, dancers, aerialists and acrobats. Todd-Jones also designed puppets and full-body costumes for River of Kings, a puppetry festival in Bangkok, Thailand, performed in front of the Thai Royal Palace in January 2003.

In recent years, Todd-Jones has specialised in bridging the disciplines of live performance and computer graphic animation, developing techniques in optical motion capture, performance animation and digital puppetry. He was integral to the development and production of the pre-school TV series, "What's Your News?", broadcast on Nick Jr, which was entered for the “Japan Prize”, an international competition for educational shows, organised by NHK (Japan’s equivalent of the BBC) in Tokyo. They had over 360 shows entered from 65 countries and “What’s Your News” not only won “Best Pre-School Show” but also the overall “Grand Prix Prize”.

Environmental advocacy

Todd-Jones's performance in a full-body rhinoceros costume for the Sir Peter Hall/ Gerald Scarfe stage production led to his involvement in the London-based charity Save the Rhino, for whom he became a patron. He has raised money for the charity by running marathons as a rhinoceros, appearing at fund-raising events, and by walking across Africa (from sea level to the summit of Mount Kilimanjaro) in the rhino costume, alongside author Douglas Adams. 

Todd-Jones has started that he is determined to use his art to help people be aware of environmental issues. He spent 2009 helping create the Ice Bear Project, aimed at drawing the public's attention to the issues around ocean temperature increase and how it affects the Arctic. He and his team took a life size ice sculpture of a polar bear to the Copenhagen Climate Conference; as the ice melted, the bear's bronze skeleton was revealed.

References

External links
 William Todd-Jones interviewed by Guy Cracknell
 
 Todd's TEDx Bulgaria 2019
 

1958 births
Living people
British puppeteers
Muppet performers